Queens Place may refer to the following places:

Queens Place Mall, an urban shopping mall in New York City, United States
Queens Place (complex), a twin-tower skyscraper project in Melbourne, Australia